In Rock may refer to:

 In Rock (The Minus 5 album)
 Deep Purple in Rock, an album by Deep Purple

See also
Les Inrockuptibles, frequently shortened to "Les Inrock"